Sebastian Fries (born January 24, 1993) is a German footballer who plays as a forward for TSV Karlburg.

Career

Fries came through Carl Zeiss Jena's youth system and made his debut in April 2011, as a substitute for Orlando Smeekes in a 3. Liga match against Kickers Offenbach. He signed for Kickers Würzburg in July 2014.

External links

1993 births
Living people
German footballers
FC Carl Zeiss Jena players
3. Liga players
Association football forwards